Melaleuca viminalis, commonly known as weeping bottlebrush or creek bottlebrush, is a plant in the myrtle family Myrtaceae, and is endemic to New South Wales, Queensland and Western Australia. (Some Australian state herbaria continue to use the name Callistemon viminalis.) It is a multi-trunked, large shrub or tree with hard bark, often pendulous foliage and large numbers of bright red bottlebrush flowers in spring and summer. It is possibly the most commonly cultivated melaleuca in gardens and its cultivars are often grown in many countries.

Description
The leaves have a mid-vein, 9-27 lateral veins and large number of conspicuous oil glands.

The flowers are bright red and are arranged in spikes on and around the ends of branches which continue to grow after flowering. The bundles are sometimes obscure but each contains 9 to 14 stamens. Flowering occurs from September to December and often sporadically throughout the year.

Taxonomy and naming
This species was first formally described in 1788 by Joseph Gaertner, who gave it the name Metrosideros viminalis in De Fructibus et Seminibus Plantarum. In 1984, Norman Brice Byrnes transerred the species to Melaleuca as M. viminalis in the journal Austrobaileya.

In 2009, Lyndley Craven described Melaleuca viminalis subsp. rhodendron in the journal 
Novon, and the name, and that of the autonym are accepted by Plants of the World Online:
 Melaleuca viminalis (Sol. ex Gaertn.)

The specific epithet (viminalis) means "having long, slender branches".

The Australian Plant Census regards Metrosideros viminalis, Melaleuca viminalis, Melaleuca viminalis subsp. viminalis and Callistemon viminalis subsp. viminalis as synonyms of Callistemon viminalis.

Distribution and habitat
This melaleuca occurs along the eastern part of Queensland from the Cape York Peninsula south to Moree and Grafton in New South Wales. There are also disjunct populations in the far north and south-west of Western Australia. It mostly grows in and along watercourses, mainly in sandstone or granite country.

Ecology
Melaleuca viminalis provides food for nectivores. Its adaptations to survive strong currents during flood events allow it to slow the flow of floodwater and reduce erosion, thereby improving the water quality in streams and rivers. The matted roots of this species also strengthen the soil of riverbanks, further reducing the potential for erosion.

Use in horticulture
A widely grown garden plant and street tree, usually known as Callistemon viminalis, Melaleuca viminalis is a hardy species in most soils when grown in full sun. It is useful as a screening plant and is suitable for planting as a street tree. It needs regular watering but can survive drought as a mature plant although it is not frost hardy and will succumb to salt spray.

Many cultivars of this species have been developed as cultivars of Callistemon. They include:

C. viminalis 'Captain Cook';
C. viminalis 'Rose Opal';
C. viminalis 'Dawson River Weeper';
C. viminalis 'Hannah Ray';
C. viminalis 'Prolific';
C. viminalis 'Hen Camp Creek';
C. viminalis 'Wild River'.

References

viminalis
Flora of New South Wales
Flora of Queensland
Plants described in 1788
Garden plants of Australia
Taxa named by Joseph Gaertner